Kosztowy is a quarter of the city of Mysłowice in the Silesian Voivodship of Poland. The formerly independent municipality is approximately 4 km south the city centre of Mysłowice, close to the neighbouring city of Imielin. In the course of a major re-organisation of municipal borders in Upper Silesia it was incorporated into Mysłowice together with Wesoła and Dziećkowice.

It has an area of 5,17 km2 and in 2012 had a population of 3,480.

History

The first mentioning of Kosztowy is in an old document from the 14th century. During that time it belonged to the Duchy of Ratibor. In 1391 Duke Johann II (the Iron) gave the large forests surrounding Kosztowy, Imielin and Gross Chelm to the Bishop of Kraków. Since the bishops were also civil administrators of their areas, Kosztowy did not become part of Silesia until 1742. In 1772 it became part of Prussia and from 1792 it belonged to the newly formed district of Imielin. In 1807 it became part of the Principality of Siewierz governed by the French marshal Jean Lannes. In 1817 it was returned to Prussia. The upper-silesian village of Kosztowy had 718 inhabitants in 1885. From 1818 to 1922 it was part of the Kreis (district) of Pless until it was turned over to Poland in 1922.

Facilities

Near Kosztowy there is an FM- and TV-transmission facility with a  guyed mast.

References

Mysłowice
Neighbourhoods in Silesian Voivodeship